František Koláček (9 October 1851, Slavkov u Brna, Moravia – 8 December 1913, Prague) was a Czech physicist.

Koláček studied at the German gymnasium in Brno (finished in 1868), then at the technical universities in Prague and Vienna. At the Charles University in Prague, under guidance of Ernst Mach, he obtained the doctoral decree in 1877. He worked as a teacher at the gymnasium in Brno (1 year) and then in Prague (18 years). Only in 1891 was he named professor of mathematical physics at Charles university. During 1900 - 1902 he worked as a professor at the university in Brno but then returned to Prague.

Koláček worked in the fields of hydrodynamics, thermodynamics, optics and electromagnetic theory of light. He was the first one to describe the electromagnetic theory of light dispersion.

References
 Příruční slovník naučný 1962 (encyclopedia by Czechoslovak Academy of Sciences): volume II, page 529.

External links 
 Short biography, other references (in Czech)

1851 births
1913 deaths
19th-century Czech scientists
19th-century physicists
Czech physicists
Charles University alumni
People from Slavkov u Brna